Pier Andrea Saccardo (23 April 1845 in Treviso, Treviso – 12 February 1920 in Padua ) was an Italian botanist and mycologist. 
 Pietro Saccardo (Venice, September 28, 1830 – Chirignago, November 19, 1903) was an Italian architect.
 Tim Saccardo is a comedy writer and producer.